Mělník is a town in the Central Bohemian Region of the Czech Republic. It has about 19,000 inhabitants. The town centre is well preserved and is protected by law as an urban monument zone.

Mělník lies in one of the most important agricultural areas of the country. The town is known for its production of wine.

Administrative parts

Mělník is made up of one administrative part.

Geography
It lies on the right bank of the Elbe, at the confluence of the Elbe and Vltava rivers.

The town is located in the Polabí lowlands. The southwestern part of the municipal territory is located in the Central Bohemian Table plateau, the northeastern part is located in the Jizera Table.

History
In the 5th and 6th century, many Slavonic tribes lived here and the tribe of Pšovans created its main settlement in Mělník. Saint Ludmila (the grandmother of the Saint Wenceslaus), who married the Bohemian prince Bořivoj I, belonged to this tribe. Coins of the princess Emma are the first demonstration of the existence of Mělník. In November 1274, Mělník gained the statute of town from King Ottokar II of Bohemia and later became a dowry town belonging to queens of Bohemia.

In 1449, the town gained the right to decide on its own affairs, through councilors headed by the mayor. The town gained fame in the first half of the 16th century thanks to viticulture, the origins of which date back to the end of the 9th century, but the preconditions for its real development were created only by Charles IV, who brought vines from Burgundy to Mělník.

The town suffered with the events of the Thirty Years' War. Mělník became moderately involved in the Bohemian Revolt (1618–1620), and was punished by confiscation of property and gradual re-Catholicization. In 1628, its population was predominantly Catholic. Mělník had to deal with enemy military incursions, especially the Saxons and the Swedes, it was also affected by devastating fires (1646, 1652, 1681), and by plague. The church, the castle and the town hall were damaged.

Even the wars in the 18th century brought considerable damage to the town, but was most affected by the fire in 1765, which destroyed 42 houses, including the town hall and the Capuchin monastery. It was followed by another stage of the baroque transformation of the town.

In 1850, Mělník became a district town. In 1869, a sugar factory was established, for a long time the only industrial company in the town. In 1874 a railway line was brought to Mělník, which helped to the economic development. In 1888 a bridge over the Elbe was built, and at the end of the 19th century a transhipment depot was built, the basis of the later port.

Demographics

Economy

Mělník is one of the largest river ports in the Czech Republic and a place of container transshipment.

Viticulture
Mělník gives its name to the Mělnická wine region, one of the most northerly in Europe. Every year, at the end of September, a wine festival is held in Mělník on the Feast of St. Wenceslaus.

According to legend, the Great Moravian Prince Svatopluk I sent the Bohemian Prince Bořivoj I a barrel of wine to celebrate the birth of his son Spytihněv I. It is said that Ludmila subsequently had vines brought from Moravia and planted not far from her birthplace, the fortified settlement of Pšov, today's Mělník. Ludmila's grandson St. Wenceslaus personally took care of the vineyards, and became the patron saint of winemakers.

Sights

Míru Square is the historic centre of Mělník. It is lined with valuable Renaissance and Neo-Renaissance houses. The landmark of the square is the town hall with Renaissance archways, Gothic bay window of the Chapel of St. Barbara, and Baroque tower. The Church of the Fourteen Holy Helpers with the building of former Capuchin monastery are also located on the square.

Mělník Castle is one of the most important sights of the town. The castle is built in the Renaissance style. Below the castle there are large wine cellars. Confiscated by the communists, it has been restored to its traditional owners, the House of Lobkowicz.

Church of Saints Peter and Paul was rebuilt three times. Construction began at the turn of the 10th and 11th centuries, but the oldest preserved part is from the 1480s. The opulent presbytary is from around 1520. Other major reconstructions were made and the fires in 1555 and 1681, when renaissance gables and the baroque dome of a gothic tower were damaged. The current appearance of the church is the result of extensive repairs in 1910 and 1913–1915. The church is still used primarily for religious functions, but it is open for the public. Starting in 2007, the public will be allowed access to the reconstructed church tower. There is a large and elaborate ossuary inside the church. Anthropologist Jindřich Matiegka conducted research here between 1915 and 1919, during which he arranged the remains of 10–15,000 people.
  
Behind the church there is a building of the old school, formerly the seat of the Mělník's chapter. It used to be a part of the town's fortifications. Remains of the fortifications are still preserved, including a 20m high water tower from the 16th century. The most preserved part is the Prague Gate from the 1530s. Near the castle there is Villa Carola, where the town library is located, which is a part of the Culture centre of Mělník.

Notable people

Ludmila of Bohemia (c. 860–921), martyr and saint
Emma of Mělník (bef. 950–1005/06), wife of Boleslaus II; died here
John Henry (1322–1375), Count of Tyrol and Margrave of Moravia
Barbara of Cilli (1392–1451), queen; lived and died here
Viktor Dyk (1877–1931), poet and writer
Bohumil Rameš (1895–1974), cyclist
Pavel Zářecký (born 1940), politician and lawyer
Kateřina Jacques (born 1971), politician
Pavel Verbíř (born 1972), footballer
Rudolf Kraj (born 1977), boxer
Jitka Čvančarová (born 1978), actress
Václav Drobný (1980–2012), footballer
Jiří Prskavec (born 1993), canoeist

Twin towns – sister cities

Mělník is twinned with:
 Lučenec, Slovakia
 Oranienburg, Germany
 Przeworsk, Poland
 Sandanski, Bulgaria (the municipality also includes Melnik)
 Wetzikon, Switzerland

Gallery

References

External links

Melnik2000.cz
Culture in Melnik

Cities and towns in the Czech Republic
Populated places in Mělník District
Populated riverside places in the Czech Republic
Populated places on the Elbe